The  was a large class of submarine chasers built during World War I for the United States Navy. They were ordered in very large numbers in order to combat attacks by German U-boats, with 442 vessels built from 1917 to 1919. This article lists details of the sixth group of 50 ships of the class.

Ships

See also
 List of patrol vessels of the United States Navy
 List of SC-1-class subchasers (SC-1 to SC-50)
 List of SC-1-class subchasers (SC-51 to SC-100)
 List of SC-1-class subchasers (SC-101 to SC-150)
 List of SC-1-class subchasers (SC-151 to SC-200)
 List of SC-1-class subchasers (SC-201 to SC-250)
 List of SC-1-class subchasers (SC-301 to SC-350)
 List of SC-1-class subchasers (SC-351 to SC-400)

References

 

SC-1-class submarine chasers
World War I patrol vessels of the United States